The Roman Catholic Diocese of Naha() is a Latin suffragan diocese in the Ecclesiastical province of the Metropolitan Archdiocese of Nagasaki 長崎, in southern Japan.

Its cathedral episcopal see is the Cathedral of the Immaculate Heart of Mary (Kainan Church), located in the city of Naha (on and administrative capital of Okinawa).

History 
 Established in 1947 as Apostolic Administration of Okinawa and the Southern Islands alias of (the) Ryukyus, an exempt missionary pre-diocesan jurisdiction, on territory split off from the then Apostolic Prefecture of Kagoshima 鹿児島 (now a diocese in the same province).
 Promoted on December 18, 1972 as Diocese of Naha, after its see.

Ordinaries 
All Roman Rite, members of a Latin congregation

Apostolic Administrators of Okinawa and the Southern Islands
 Apollinaris William Baumgartner (アポリナリス・バウムガートナー), O.F.M. Cap. (1947 – 1949), titular bishop of Joppe (Jaffa) (1945.08.25 – 1965.10.14) and apostolic vicar of Guam (1945.08.25 – 1965.10.14), later Bishop of Agaña (Guam) (1965.10.14 – 1970.12.18)
 Felix Ley, O.F.M. Cap. (1949 – 23 January 1972), titular bishop of Caput Cilla (12 March 1968 – 23 January 1972)

Suffragan Bishops of Naha
 Peter Baptist Tadamaro Ishigami, (ペトロ・バプティスタ石神忠真郎), O.F.M. Cap. (18 December 1972 – 24 January 1997 retired) 
 Berard Toshio Oshikawa, (ベラルド押川壽夫), O.F.M. Conv. (24 January 1997 – 9 December 2017 retired)
 Wayne Francis Berndt, O.F.M. Cap. (9 December 2017 - )

See also 
 Roman Catholicism in Japan

References

Sources and external links
 Diocesan website
 GCatholic.org, with incumbent biography links
 Catholic Bishop's Conference of Japan

Roman Catholic dioceses in Japan
Christian organizations established in 1947
Roman Catholic dioceses and prelatures established in the 20th century
1947 establishments in Japan
Religion in the Ryukyu Islands